Avadhesh Singh is an Indian politician and a member of 17th Legislative Assembly of Pindra, Uttar Pradesh of India. He represents the Pindra constituency of Uttar Pradesh. He is a member of the Bharatiya Janata Party.

Political career
Singh has been a member of the Congress, BSP, 17th Legislative Assembly of Uttar Pradesh. Since 2017, he has represented the Pindra constituency and is a member of the BJP.

Posts held

See also
Uttar Pradesh Legislative Assembly

References

Uttar Pradesh MLAs 2017–2022
Living people
Bharatiya Janata Party politicians from Uttar Pradesh
Politicians from Varanasi
Year of birth missing (living people)
Uttar Pradesh MLAs 2022–2027